Ajit Prasad Jain (6 October 1902 – 2 January 1977) was an Indian politician who served as the President of the U. P. Congress Committee, member of the Constituent Assembly, Union minister and Governor of Kerala from Saharanpur, in the state of Uttar Pradesh, India.

Early life 
He was born in Meerut in 1902 in a middle-class family. He graduated with Honours at the Lucknow University and also took his LL.B. He started his legal practice in 1926. He was an alumnus of the SM College, Chandausi. Soon after A.P. Jain was drawn to politics and joined the Indian National Congress.

Political career  
He took part in the Civil Disobedience Movement (1930) and all later Congress movements. He soon became prominent in U.P. politics. He became a member of the U.P. Congress working committee and also the Secretary of Provincial Congress Committee. He was elected to the Constituent Assembly from the United Provinces. 
He was appointed a Parliamentary Secretary in the U.P. Government 1937 and remained in office till the resignation of the Ministry in 1939. He was a member of the All India Congress Committee for a long time. He was a minister with cabinet rank in charge of the Ministry of Rehabilitation under Nehru following the constitution of the First Lok Sabha in 1952.

He subsequently held the portfolio of Union Minister for Food and Agriculture in Mr. Nehru's cabinet from December 1954 to August 1959. He became President of the U.P. Congress Committee in May 1961. When Rafi Ahmed Kidwai formed the All India Kisan Mazdoor Praja Party owing to ideological differences with the then Congress president Purushottam Das Tandon, Jain handed in his resignation to Nehru in solidarity with Kidwai. Nehru however turned it down.

He succeeded V. V. Giri as the third governor of Kerala serving from 2 April 1965 to 6 February 1966 during which time the state remained under President's rule. He resigned from the post of Governor to canvass support for Mrs. Indira Gandhi for position of Prime Minister following the untimely death of Lal Bahadur Shastri. He belonged to the leftist section of the Congress and wanted to strengthen this section by opposing Morarji Desai.

Later he was elected to the Rajya Sabha  in 1967 and remained a member till 1975.

He accepted the Chairmanship of the Irrigation Commission and the report of this commission remains a monumental work.

He was a member of the Zamidari Abolition Committee in UP and was instrumental in the drafting of Zamidari Abolition bill and in the plan to link the rivers of India. His far-sightedness in this project and in the establishment of green revolution led to the self-sufficiency of food in India.

He established Seva Nidhi Trust in Saharanpur & in Fatehpur in UP, India, which till date is running a house for destitutes, TB clinic & free eye camps. Additionally it gives out scholarships to poor and needy students. These establishments are being guided by his son Dr K P Jain, a renowned doctor in Delhi (Ex chairman Ganga Ram Hospital). Ajit Prasad Jain won the 1952 and 1957 Lok Sabha election as the Congress Party candidate from Saharanpur (Uttar Pradesh) and from Tumkur (Karnataka) where he won in 1962.

He chaired the Uttar Pradesh Police Commission, looking into police reforms in the state, from 1960 and it submitted its report in 1961. His Shadow of the bear: The Indo-Soviet treaty was published in 1971 and Kashmir: what really happened, based on his recollection of events that led to the arrest of Sheikh Abdullah in 1953, in 1972.

Death 
Ajit Prasad Jain died on 2 January 1977 at the age of 75.

References

External links
List of Kerala Governor
The city of hope: the Faridabad story By L. C. Jain*Official biographical sketch in Parliament of India website

 http://dspace.wbpublibnet.gov.in:8080/jspui/bitstream/10689/11626/9/Chapter%204_221-273p.pdf

1902 births
1977 deaths
India MPs 1952–1957
India MPs 1957–1962
India MPs 1962–1967
Governors of Kerala
Lok Sabha members from Uttar Pradesh
Members of the Constituent Assembly of India
People from Saharanpur district
Jain Indian independence activists